State Route 892 (SR 892) is a state highway in White Pine County, Nevada, United States.

Major intersections

References

892
Transportation in White Pine County, Nevada